Sudafi S. Henry is the former Director of Legislative Affairs for Joe Biden, the Vice President of the United States from 2009 to 2017.

Henry was previously Counsel and Senior Policy Advisor for House Majority Leader Steny Hoyer (D-MD), working closely with Congress, leadership staff and committee staff on crafting and winning passage of critical legislation, with a particular focus on trade, telecommunications, economic matters and responses to the current financial crisis. Henry has also served as a liaison for Rep. Hoyer to policy experts, business leaders, and constituency group leaders on pending legislation. Henry has more than 10 years of experience on Capitol Hill, including his work for Reps. Major Owens (D-NY) and Emanuel Cleaver (D-MO) as the Legislative Director for both Members. A native of Los Angeles, California, Henry received a B.A. from the University of Maryland at College Park and a J.D. from George Washington University Law School, and is a member of the Maryland bar.

References

External links
Salaries, trips and personal finances at Legistorm.com
A Rising Star on Capitol Hill, Jamie L. Freedman, George Washington University, 2009 Summer

Living people
Year of birth missing (living people)
Obama administration personnel
People from Los Angeles
University of Maryland, College Park alumni
George Washington University Law School alumni
Biden administration personnel